Tolumnia is a genus of stink bugs in the tribe Cappaeini.

Species
These species belong to the genus Tolumnia:
Tolumnia antennata Distant, 1902
Tolumnia basalis (Dallas, 1851)
Tolumnia elongata Hasan & Ahmad, 1988
Tolumnia gutta (Dallas, 1851)
Tolumnia horni Breddin, 1909
Tolumnia immaculata Distant, 1900
Tolumnia latipes (Dallas, 1851)
Tolumnia longirostris (Dallas, 1851)
Tolumnia malayensis Hasan & Ahmad, 1988
Tolumnia maxima Distant, 1902
Tolumnia papulifera Bergroth, 1922
Tolumnia southwoodi Hasan & Ahmad, 1988
Tolumnia trinotata (Westwood, 1837)

References

Pentatomidae
Pentatomidae genera
Taxa named by Carl Stål